Mariya Tikhvinskaya (born 24 February 1970) is a Russian snowboarder. She competed in the women's parallel giant slalom event at the 2002 Winter Olympics.

References

1970 births
Living people
Russian female snowboarders
Olympic snowboarders of Russia
Snowboarders at the 2002 Winter Olympics
Sportspeople from Saint Petersburg